The tubular hydroid (Ectopleura crocea) is a species of hydroid cnidarian, and is found in temperate coastal waters. It is a member of the family Tubulariidae.

Description
The tubular hydroid resembles a long-stemmed narrow-petalled flower. The stem is encased in a sheath. The polyps are pink or orange and white, with an outer ring of long tentacles. There are short tentacles surrounding the mouth rising from a cluster of yellow bead-like bunches of reproductive sporosacs.

Distribution
This species is native to the Atlantic coast of North America, and also occurs in the Mediterranean Sea, the northeastern Atlantic Ocean, South Africa, Australia, New Zealand, and the west coast of North America.

Ecology
Male and female sporosacs are on separate hydranths (feeding individuals) in the colony. These animals feed on tiny planktonic crustaceans.

References

Tubulariidae
Animals described in 1862